The Collection is a compilation album by Irish musical group Clannad, released in 1986 by K-tel International Ltd. It consists of their greatest hits dating back to 1972, with the tracks featuring a mix between pop rock influenced songwriting done by the band in addition to traditional folk music. The album saw a 1987 release on compact disc, which include a comment on the back cover by Irish journalist Tommie Gorman stating: "freed at least by recognition, their creative instincts have found a new strength."

Track listing 
"Theme From Harry's Game"
"Closer to Your Heart"
"Lady Marian"
"Newgrange"
"Mhórag 'S Na Horo Gheallaidh"
"Níl Sé Ina Lá (Níl Sé'n Lá)"
"Caisleán Óir"
"In A Lifetime"
"Now Is Here"
"Na Buachaillí Álainn"
"Down by the Sally Gardens"
"Dúlamán"
"Robin (The Hooded Man)"

1990 greatest hits albums
Clannad compilation albums
RCA Records compilation albums